Red-light districts are areas associated with the sex industry and sex-oriented businesses (e.g. sex shops and strip clubs). In some of these places prostitution occurs, whether legally or illegally. The enforcement of prostitution laws varies by region.

Following is a partial list of well known red-light districts around the world, both current and historical.

Africa

Algeria
Prostitution is legal but third-party involvement is prohibited.

 Constantine
 Rahbat al-Jammal (defunct)

Burkina Faso
Prostitution is not specifically prohibited by the law, but soliciting and pimping are illegal.
 Ouagadougou
 Dapoya

Egypt
Prostitution in Egypt is illegal.

 Alexandria
 Kom al-Nadura (defunct)
 Kom Bakir (defunct)
 Al-Tartushi (defunct)
Cairo
Wagh El Birket (defunct)

Ivory Coast
Prostitution in Ivory Coast is legal.

Abidjan
 Marcory Zone 4
 Rue Princesse

Kenya
Prostitution is illegal.

Nairobi
 Koinange Street

Mauritania
Prostitution in Mauritania is illegal.

 Nouakchott
 El Mina

Morocco
Prostitution is illegal.

South Africa
Prostitution is illegal.

Tunisia
Prostitution is regulated.

 Tunis
 Sidi Abdallah Guech

Asia

Bangladesh
Prostitution in Bangladesh is legal and regulated.

Cambodia
Prostitution is illegal, but tolerated.

Phnom Penh
 Svay Pak

China

Prostitution is illegal.

Hong Kong
Prostitution itself is not illegal but operating a brothel is illegal.

 Lockhart Road
 Sham Shui Po/Fuk Wa Street

India
Prostitution is legal when performed by a person acting alone in private but public solicitation, brothels and pimping are illegal (however in practice prostitution is tolerated and regulated).

Indonesia

Prostitution is illegal in non-regulated areas. Prostitution is legal in some locations (including pimping and maintaining a brothel).

Iran

Prostitution in Iran is illegal, and incurs various punishments ranging from fines and jail terms to execution for repeat offenders.
 Tehran
 Shahr-e No (demolished 1980)

Iraq

Prostitution in Iraq is illegal, and penalties are severe.

 Baghdad
 Al-Battaween
 Bataween
 Haifa Street/Salhia neighborhood
 Kamaliyah
 Zayouna

Israel

 Tel Aviv
 Old bus station area.

Japan

Prostitution is illegal but narrowly defined. Many sexual acts for pay that would be considered to be prostitution in other countries are legal.

Jordan
Prostitution is illegal.

 Amman
 Jubeiha
 Sweifieh

Kyrgyzstan
Prostitution is legal but pimping and operating a brothel are illegal.

 Bishkek
 Pravda Street

South Korea

Prostitution is illegal, but in practice it is tolerated and regulated.

Malaysia

Prostitution in most of Malaysia is legal and widespread, though there are laws against prostitution-related activities. However, prostitution is illegal in Malaysia's Kelantan state.

Kuala Lumpur
 Brickfields area: Jalan Hicks and Jalan Thamibipilly
 Bukit Bintang: Jalan Alor and Changkat Bukit Bintang
 Chow Kit
 Jalan Petaling
 Lorong Haji Taib

Pakistan

Prostitution is illegal, but in practice it is somewhat tolerated although not regulated.

Philippines

Prostitution is illegal, but widespread and generally tolerated.

Angeles City
 Fields Avenue
 Manila
 EDSA Entertainment Complex, Pasay 
 Ermita 
 Malate
 Padre Burgos Street, Makati
 Poblacion, Makati
Olongapo City
 Subic Bay

Singapore
Prostitution itself is not illegal; however, public solicitation, living on the earnings of a prostitute, and maintaining a brothel are illegal.

 Geylang
 Orchard Towers

Taiwan
Prostitution in Taiwan was made illegal under a 1991 law. Legislation was introduced in 2011 to allow local governments in Taiwan to set up "special zones" where prostitution is permitted. Outside these zones prostitution is illegal. As of 2017 no "special zones" had been opened.

 Taipei
 Snake Alley (defunct)

Thailand

Prostitution is illegal in Thailand, and solicitation and public nuisance laws are in effect. In practice it is tolerated and partly regulated.

Turkey
Ankara
 Bentderesi
İstanbul
 Giraffe Lane, Beyoğlu

Europe

Austria
Prostitution is legal and regulated.

Linz
 Bäckermühlweg
Vienna
Gürtel
Stuwerviertel

Belgium

Prostitution is legal, though brothels are not. Enforcement of the law can be lax.

Croatia
Prostitution is illegal.

 Zagreb
 Tkalčićeva Street (defunct since World War II)

Czech Republic
Prostitution is legal, but brothels and other forms of procuring are prohibited.

Prague
Perlovka

Denmark
Prostitution is legal, but running brothels and pimping are illegal.

 Copenhagen
Halmtorvet
Istedgade

Finland
Prostitution is legal, but running brothels and pimping are illegal.

 Helsinki
Aleksis Kiven katu and Vaasankatu

France
Paying for sex, pimping and keeping a brothel are illegal. Prostitutes commit no offence unless soliciting.

Germany

Prostitution is legal and regulated.

Gibraltar

Prostitution illegal.

 Seruya's Ramp, (Calle Peligro) (defunct)

Greece
Prostitution is legal and regulated.

Athens
Fylis Street
Metaxourgeio Area

Ireland
Paying for sex is illegal, as is soliciting in a public place, operating brothels, and other forms of pimping. 

Dublin
Monto (defunct)
Grafton Street (defunct)

Italy
Prostitution in Italy is legal, although organized prostitution, whether indoors in brothels or controlled by third parties, is prohibited.

 Catania, Sicily
 San Berillo
Venice
 Carampane di Rialto, including Ponte delle Tette (defunct)

Luxembourg
Prostitution is legal, but running brothels and pimping are illegal.

Luxembourg railway station area

Malta
Prostitution is legal, but running brothels and pimping are illegal.

 Gżira
 Mello Area (Triq Testaferrata)
Marsa
Albert Town Area
St. Julian's
Paceville
Valletta 
 Strait Street – known as "The Gut" by the British Navy (defunct)

Netherlands

Prostitution and associated activities are legal and common. A total of 11 cities in the Netherlands have red light districts with window prostitution.

Portugal
Prostitution is legal, but running brothels and pimping are illegal.

Lisbon
Cais do Sodré (defunct)
Rua Nova do Carvalho (defunct)
Porto
Rua Coelho Neto
Rua Conde de Ferreira
 Rua Escura
Braga
Residencial Cairense

Spain
Brothels are illegal (since 1956), but "clubs" and "wiskerias" are fronts for prostitution and are tolerated.

Switzerland
Prostitution is legal and regulated.

United Kingdom

England
Prostitution is not illegal when performed by a person acting alone in private, but public solicitation, brothels and pimping are. The Policing and Crime Act 2009 makes it illegal to pay for sex with a prostitute who has been "subjected to force" and this is a strict liability offence (clients can be prosecuted even if they did not know the prostitute was forced).

Northern Ireland

Belfast
Albert Memorial Clock, Belfast (defunct)
Amelia Street (defunct)
 Linenhall Street

Scotland

Wales
Cardiff
Tiger Bay
Newport
Commercial Road, Pillgwenlly (Pill)

North America

Antigua and Barbuda
Prostitution is legal but related activities are prohibited.

 St. John's
 Popeshead Street.

Aruba
Prostitution is legal and regulated.
Sint Nicolaas.

Barbados
Prostitution is legal but related activities such as brothel keeping and solicitation are prohibited.

 Bridgetown
 Nelson street

Canada

Prostitution itself is legal but the purchase of sexual services is not (the client commits the offence not the prostitute). Many associated activities (brothels, advertising, street walking) are also illegal.

Montreal 
Red-Light District (historic): The area centred around Saint Catherine Street and Saint-Laurent Boulevard was historically the city's red light district throughout much of the 20th century, as well as being known for strip clubs and sex shops. In recent decades this has changed drastically as the area gentrified into the Quartier des Spectacles and today prostitution is virtually nonexistent.

Centre-Sud: The Centre-Sud, of which Sainte-Marie is a part, was notorious for prostitution from the 1990s well into the 2010s, particularly on Ontario Street and Dufresne Street. In recent years, gentrification has changed this significantly.
Hochelaga-Maisonneuve: Known for prostitution, particularly in the lower southwestern Hochelaga segment. 
Ahuntsic: Located in the north end of Montreal, parts of the Ahuntsic neighbourhood have long been known for prostitution and drugs, partly due to a large presence of cheap motels on Lajeunesse Street and proximity to Quebec Autoroute 40.
Vancouver
 Chinatown, Vancouver (historic): Dupont Street, between Westminster Ave (Main Street) and Carrall, was Vancouver's first official red light district which began when Bridie Stewart set up a shop at 101 Dupont. The district was relocated in 1906 to Shanghai and Canton Alley, which collaboratively hosted 105 brothels. It was later closed and relocated to Shore Street, then Alexander in 1912.
 West End, Vancouver: An unofficial city red-light district located on and around Davie Street. The sex work hub from the 1960s-1983. Coined the "Prostitution Capitol of Canada", which served as a safe community where cisgender, transgender, and two-spirit workers of many ages worked together and looked out for each other's safety. The location of the informative documentary Hookers on Davie. Diminished by the 1983 injunction formed by the Concerned Residents of the West End (CROWE) which forcefully displaced sex workers out of the West End.
 Downtown Eastside: An unlisted district in Vancouver where workers face routine violence and harassment. The Downtown Eastside is the sex trades final destination of city displacement over several years. In 2003, a large number of sex workers went missing and/or were murdered. Many of these were tied to serial killer Robert Pickton, and were the largest contributor to the missing and murdered indigenous women and girls (MMIWG) cases over the years. Today workers are increasingly facing the effects of new developments and surveillance that are pushing them into isolated areas where they are at greater risk of harm; forcing them to rush or forgo screening and negotiation processes that puts them at a greater risk of bad dates and STI contraction.

Costa Rica
Prostitution is legal but related activities such as brothel keeping are illegal.

 San José
 Gringo Gulch

Guatemala
Prostitution is legal but procuring is prohibited.

 Guatemala City
 La Linea
 El Trebol
 Parque Concordia

Mexico

Prostitution is legal and regulated.

Panama
Panama City
 El Cangrejo

United States
Prostitution laws vary by state and territory, however it is illegal except for some rural counties of Nevada. Strip clubs are legal in most areas, including fully nude strip clubs. Many massage shops offer "happy endings", which is an illegal form of prostitution.

Oceania

Australia

Prostitution laws vary by state, either being legal or decriminalized.

New Zealand

Prostitution and associated activities are legal.

See also

 Prostitution by region
 Prostitution law

References

 List of
Lists of places
Lists by country